Stuart Leonard Pimm (born 27 February 1949) is an American-British biologist and theoretical ecologist specializing in scientific research of biodiversity and conservation biology.

Education 
Pimm was born in Derbyshire, United Kingdom. He was educated at the University of Oxford and was awarded a PhD in Ecology from New Mexico State University in 1974.

Research 
Pimm is currently Doris Duke Chair of Conservation Ecology in the Nicholas School of the Environment at Duke University, Durham, North Carolina. He is an acknowledged authority in the field of conservation biology, recognized with several awards including the Heineken Prize and the Tyler Prize for Environmental Achievement. Pimm has collaborated with a wide range of other scientists, including Robert May, Peter H. Raven, Joel E. Cohen, George Sugihara and Jared Diamond. His work has examined the mathematical properties of food webs and indicated that complex food webs should be less stable than simple food webs.

Publications 

Pimm has published more than 250 peer-reviewed scientific articles, including several in the scientific journals Nature and Science". He has published several books including, A Scientist Audits the Earth and he has published articles in popular science publications such as Scientific American. Up until mid-2019, he was a regular contributor to the National Geographic blog.

Awards 
Pimm is a Master of Ecological Conservation with The Beijing DeTao Masters Academy (DTMA), a high-level, multi-disciplined, application-oriented higher education institution in Shanghai, China.

Pimm was awarded the 2019 International Cosmos Prize in recognition of his research and conservation efforts, as well as his role in mentoring students.

A new wasp species from the cloud forests of Colombia's tropical Andes has been named Dolichomitus pimmi in honor of Pimm and his conservation efforts in that region.

SavingSpecies and Saving Nature 
In 2010, Pimm founded a non-profit organization called SavingSpecies. The organization was dissolved in July 2019. In 2019, he founded a non-profit organization called Saving Nature that continues the work of habitat preservation and restoration formerly supported by SavingSpecies.

Controversy
In 2014, Pimm was involved in a controversy related to allegedly sexist remarks he made in a book review published by the Elsevier journal Biological Conservation. Pimm's article "sparked debate on Twitter almost immediately."

Despite pressure from activists (ibid.), the journal refused to retract Pimm's review, saying "The Book Review by Pimm is not being retracted. It just contains some offensive language. We want to emphasize to our readers that this type of offensive language does not reflect the policy or practice of our journal or Elsevier. We also have taken steps to ensure that this situation does not happen again." 

However, the journal did issue a mea culpa, indicating an opinion of Pimm's article. "We would like to inform our readers that parts of the book review Keeping Wild: Against the Domestication of the Earth by Stuart Pimm, Volume 180, pages 151–152 are denigrating to women.". Of Pimm's article, the journal admitted that "It just contains some offensive language." When challenged, Pimm responded that he did not think his "wording was sexist..." However, some disagreed. In a later letter to the editor, Amanda Stanley, then Conservation Science Program Officer at the Wilburforce Foundation, explained why Pimm's "...book review [was] so offensive." An article in The New Yorker later that year explored the debate between conservationists that led to Pimm's controversial remark. The article asserted that, in his review, "Pimm’s emotions got the better of him." For his part, according to the article, Pimm was reported as being " totally unrepentant."

Personal 
Pimm married Julia Killeffer in 1990. He has two daughters from a previous marriage, both in the United States. One of those daughters, Shama, has Schizophrenia.

References 

1949 births
Living people
American ecologists
American science writers
Duke University faculty
Fellows of the American Academy of Arts and Sciences
Conservation biologists
Academic scandals